Radek Buchta (born 22 April 1989) is a Czech football player who currently plays for Blansko.

References
 
 Profile at FC Zbrojovka Brno official site

Czech footballers
Czech First League players
Czech National Football League players
FC Zbrojovka Brno players
FK Blansko players
Footballers from Brno
1989 births
Living people

Association football midfielders